Juliet Mia Warner (born ) is an American actress. She is best known as Danni on Family Law (1999–2001) and Megan on Nip/Tuck (2003-2006), Lou in Doc Hollywood (1991), Elaine in Mr. Saturday Night (1992), Michelle in Tommy Boy (1995), Micki in Wedding Bell Blues (1996), and Dean York in Chalk It Up (2016). She also appeared in the 1989 HBO special The Diceman Cometh with comedian Andrew Dice Clay.

Early life
Warner was born to Naomi, an independent marketing consultant, and Neil Warner, a composer and pianist. Her paternal grandfather, Jack Shilkret, and paternal great uncle, Nathaniel Shilkret, were composers. Warner attended the Dalton School at age twelve. There she met an agent who advised Warner to consider acting. Shortly thereafter, Warner landed a role on the soap opera Guiding Light. Warner studied theater arts at Brown University. After her graduation, Warner moved to Los Angeles, where she worked as a waitress while auditioning for acting roles. She is Jewish.

Career
Warner performed in conservatory theater and summer stock theater and appeared in two episodes of Star Trek: The Next Generation, "Booby Trap" in 1989 and "Transfigurations" in 1990. She also made commercials for products, including Pert Plus.

Her breakout role was in the 1991 film Doc Hollywood, co-starring with Michael J. Fox, followed by her co-starring role with Billy Crystal in 1992's Mr. Saturday Night. She was in Indian Summer in 1993,  The Puppet Masters, based on Robert A Heinlein's novel of the same name in 1994, and Tommy Boy in 1995. Also in 1995, she portrayed Amy Sherman in Pride and Joy. She played the role of Danni Lipton in the TV series Family Law, and the recurring character Megan O'Hara in Nip/Tuck. In 2005, Warner began starring as the wife to Howie Mandel in his short-lived hidden camera/situation comedy Hidden Howie: The Private Life of a Public Nuisance and later appeared in the 2006 film Stick It. Other credits include a guest appearance on an episode of House. She starred in the 2008 Hallmark Channel movie Our First Christmas, where she plays a mother trying to navigate the difficult waters of combining two families after the deaths of her own and her new husband's spouses. In 2009, she played Rose Pinchbinder in the children's TV show True Jackson, VP in the episode "Keeping Tabs". In 2012, she guest starred in a season seven episode of Dexter, "Chemistry", as the sister of Hannah McKay's dead husband.

Personal life
In June 1995, Warner married writer-director Jonathan Prince. They have a son named Jackson, born in 1997. They later divorced.

Filmography

Film

Television

References

External links
 
 

1960s births
Actresses from New York City
American film actresses
American television actresses
Brown University alumni
Dalton School alumni
Living people
People from Manhattan
Jewish American actresses
21st-century American Jews
21st-century American women